Anna C. Belknap is an American actress. She is known for her role as Detective Lindsay Monroe Messer on CSI: NY.

Early life
Belknap was born in Damariscotta, Maine. She is a daughter of David and Louise Belknap. She attended Lincoln Academy in Newcastle, Maine. While attending Middlebury College in Vermont, she gained an interest in acting. She then studied at the American Conservatory Theater, earning a Master of Fine Arts degree.

Career
Belknap's television credits include series regular roles in Medical Investigation and The Handler, a recurring role in Deadline, and guest-starring roles in Law & Order, Law & Order: Special Victims Unit, and Without a Trace.

Belknap appeared in the movie Alchemy and made her feature film debut in the independent film The Reality Trap.

Belknap joined the cast of the long-running crime drama CSI: NY as Detective Lindsay Monroe in 2005 during the season two's episode, "Zoo York".

Her stage credits include the Off-Broadway production of Metamorphoses at New York's Second Stage Theatre, as well as roles at the Mark Taper Forum, the Old Globe Theatre, the Westport Country Playhouse, and the Williamstown Theatre Festival.

Personal life
In 2004, Belknap married Eric Siegel, a colleague from the  Rude Mechanicals Theater Company in New York. They have two children: Olive and George.

During filming for the show CSI: NY, an episode describes her being bitten by a cobra. This event was used to reduce her screen time during her first pregnancy (which, unlike her second one, was not written into the show). She also left to go home to Montana in an episode to testify in a trial to cut her screen time. Her second pregnancy was written into several episodes of season five, where her character has a daughter with husband Danny Messer.

Accolades
Belknap was the recipient of the 2002 San Diego Theater Critics Circle's Craig Noel Award for Outstanding Performance as Marina in the Old Globe Theatre's production of Pericles by William Shakespeare.

Filmography

References

External links
 
 Anna Belknap: CSI: NY Cast at CBS

20th-century American actresses
21st-century American actresses
Actresses from Maine
American television actresses
American video game actresses
American Conservatory Theater alumni	
Living people
Middlebury College alumni
People from Damariscotta, Maine
Year of birth missing (living people)
Lincoln Academy (Maine) alumni